Greek is an American comedy-drama television series which follows the students of fictional Cyprus-Rhodes University (CRU) who participate in the school's Greek system. It was created by Patrick Sean Smith and premiered on ABC Family network on July 9, 2007.

Series overview 
After the first 10 episodes of Greek aired, production was halted because of the Writers Guild Strike. Prior to the airing of the remainder of season 1, a compilation of the first 10 episodes titled Season One: Chapter One was released. Following suit, the latter half of season 1 was later compiled as Season 1: Chapter Two. Later seasons would be divided into two halves, or simply "chapters."

Episodes

Season 1 (2007–08) 

The first chapter of Greek opens as incoming freshman, Rusty Cartwright (Jacob Zachar) matriculates at Cyprus-Rhodes University (CRU). Rusty is the science-geek brother to social butterfly of CRU's Greek system, Casey Cartwright (Spencer Grammer). When Rusty decides to rush a fraternity, their social lives collide. Rusty discovers Casey's boyfriend, Evan (Jake McDorman), cheating on Casey with Rebecca Logan (Dilshad Vadsaria), an incoming, freshman pledge. Casey gets even with Evan by sleeping with her ex-boyfriend, Cappie (Scott Michael Foster), the president of the party fraternity, Kappa Tau, which Rusty joins. Throughout the season, Casey works to repair her relationship with Evan, and deal with Rebecca's acrimonious attempt to undermine her leadership at ZBZ. Rusty navigates the balance between being a fraternity brother and honors engineering student, with the help of Casey, Cappie, his roommate Dale (Clark Duke), friend Calvin (Paul James), and his first girlfriend, Jen K. (Jessica Rose). Ashleigh (Amber Stevens) befriends Calvin, and unwittingly outs him to Omega Chi. When Jen K. writes a story for the school paper exposing Greek secrets, Casey finds herself established as ZBZ's interim president. Rusty breaks-up with Jen K., and Evan breaks-up with Casey due to her ambiguous feelings for Cappie.

Chapter two opens the first week of the new semester. The Greeks find themselves under the auspices of new rules and regulations, and Casey finds herself under the watchful eye of Nationals representative, Lizzie (Senta Moses), who brings a higher level of tradition and conservatism to the sisterhood. Cappie and Rebecca begin dating, Evan and Casey learn how to be friends until Evan's jealousy gets in the way, Casey forgives Frannie and lets her back into ZBZ, Rusty mourns the loss of his first relationship, and the rivalry between fraternities splinters his friendship with Calvin. Cappie, Casey, Evan, and Frannie's histories are explored in a flashback episode. Greek traditions are explored throughout chapter two, such as the Mr. Purr-fect competition, the All Greek Ball, and Parents Weekend. All this activity leads up to Spring Break when Rebecca's father's scandalous proclivities hit home, forcing a drunken confrontation with Cappie, an unplanned kiss on the beach between him and Casey, and a reconciliation between Rusty and Calvin.

Season 2 (2008–09) 

The third chapter opens during Greek week, Cappie and Casey try to curb Rebecca's rebellious behavior, leading to Cappie and Rebecca's breakup. Evan continues his relationship with Frannie, begun over Spring Break, his competition with Cappie heats up, and he accepts a multimillion-dollar trust fund from his parents, despite their attached strings. Casey begins dating Rusty's RA, Max (Michael Rady), a polymer science grad student, of whom Cappie grows jealous. Frannie begins a bid for a second presidential term, competing with Casey for the title, but unbeknownst to anyone Rebecca and the other pledges vote to elect Ashleigh (Amber Stevens). The chapter ends on Hell Week, when the pledges prove themselves to their houses, Casey and Max face the dilemma of a long-distance relationship, and Frannie establishes a new sorority, taking half of ZBZ with her.

It's a new year at CRU, when chapter four begins. Casey's fresh off a disappointing internship in DC, but Max turns down Caltech to stay with Casey at CRU, pushing the commitment level beyond her comfort zone. When Max leaves for a month, it gives Casey time to consider their relationship. Frannie's competitive sorority, Iota Kappa Iota challenges ZBZ during rush, forcing the once prestigious sorority to accept less esteemed pledges. Rusty begins dating Jordan, but when facing a failing grade in an important class, he decides that his social life is more important to him at the moment. Cappie and Max's dislike for each other intensifies, but Evan and Cappie begin to rekindle their friendship, when pushed together as part of the Amphora Society, CRU's secret society. Evan turns down his trust fund. Frannie puts Ashleigh in the hot seat with Panhellenic, lying to get her expelled, but in a confrontation with the ZBZ president, Frannie chooses to shut IKI down, realizing it will never be ZBZ, and leaves CRU. Casey is content to commit to Max once he returns, until a near-death experience forces her to realize that she's still in love with Cappie, but Cappie's been used too many times by Casey, and turns her down.

Season 3 (2009–10) 
The fifth chapter of Greek continues during the fall semester of last season, while the sixth chapter takes place during the winter semester.

Season 4 (2011) 
On February 19, 2010, it was announced that Greek had been renewed for a 10-episode fourth and final season. The first episode of the final season aired January 3, 2011.

Home media
In 2008, ABC/Disney released the first season on DVD in two volumes, titled Chapter One and Chapter Two. In 2009, the second season was also released on DVD in two volumes, titled Chapter Three and Chapter Four.

In 2010, Shout! Factory secured the rights for the rest of the series and released the third season on DVD as a complete set, titled Chapter Five: The Complete Third Season. On October 18, 2011, Shout! Factory released Greek: Chapter Six – The Complete Fourth Season as a Shout! Select title, available exclusively on their website. It eventually was released storewide at a later date.

References

External links 
 
 

Lists of American comedy-drama television series episodes
Lists of American teen drama television series episodes
Lists of American teen comedy television series episodes